Georgette Anys (15 July 1909 – 4 March 1993) was a French film and television actress. A character actress, she appeared mainly in French productions, but also some American films which were shot in Europe including Alfred Hitchcock's To Catch a Thief in which she plays Cary Grant's housekeeper Germaine.

Selected filmography

 Le Roi des resquilleurs (1930)
 Sending of Flowers (1950) - La spectatrice exubérante
 Old Boys of Saint-Loup (1950) - La voyageuse à l'enfant (uncredited)
 Quay of Grenelle (1950) - Minor rôle (uncredited)
 Mystery in Shanghai (1950)
 Beware of Blondes (1950) - Une sténodactylo (uncredited)
 La rue sans loi (1950) - (uncredited)
 Without Leaving an Address (1951) - La concierge de Forestier
 Under the Sky of Paris (1951) - Madame Malingret
 Mr. Peek-a-Boo (1951) - Maria (uncredited)
 The Two Girls (1951) - La lavandière
 They Were Five (1951) - (uncredited)
 La vie chantée (1951) - (uncredited)
 Moumou (1951) - La masseuse
 No Vacation for Mr. Mayor (1951) - Une créancière
 Great Man (1951) - Madame Berval
 Alone in Paris (1951) - La dame du métro
 Fanfan la Tulipe (1952) - Madame Tranche-Montagne
 Alone in the World (1952) - Mme Dussaut
 Monsieur Taxi (1952) - La marchande de salades
 La danseuse nue (1952)
 Run Away Mr. Perle (1952) - La patronne du bistrot de Romainville
 Holiday for Henrietta (1952) - La fleuriste
 My Husband Is Marvelous (1952) - L'aubergiste
 Double or Quits (1953) - Une spectatrice
 The Call of Destiny (1953) - La grosse Lolo
 Minuit... Quai de Bercy (1953) - Une cliente (uncredited)
 Innocents in Paris (1953) - Madame Celestin
 Little Boy Lost (1953) - Madame Quilleboeuf
 A Day to Remember (1953) - Jeanne Sautet (uncredited)
 Scampolo 53 (1953)
 L'Étrange Désir de monsieur Bard (1954) - Julie, l'épicière
 La chair et le diable (1954) - Mme Ancelin
 The Women Couldn't Care Less (1954) - Mrs. Martinguez
 Le Feu dans la peau (1954) - La veuve Barrot
 Madame du Barry (1954) - La citoyenne
 Pas de coup dur pour Johnny (1955)
 Les évadés (1955) - La travailleuse libre
 The Impossible Mr. Pipelet (1955) - Tante Mathilde
 To Catch a Thief (1955) - Germaine
 Milord l'Arsouille (1955)
 Thirteen at the Table (1955) - Marie-Louise Taburot
 Maid in Paris (1956)
 The Adventures of Gil Blas (1956) - Maria
 Marie Antoinette Queen of France (1956) - Une émeutière
 Les mains liées (1956)
 In the Manner of Sherlock Holmes (1956) - La femme de ménage
 Blood to the Head (1956) - Titine Babin
 La Traversée de Paris (1956) - Lucienne Couronne, la patronne du cafe Belotte
 Mannequins of Paris (1956) - Madame Vauthier
 L'homme aux clefs d'or (1956) - Mme Irma, la patronne
 Man and Child (1956) - (uncredited)
 Ah, quelle équipe! (1957) - Maman Jo
 The Vintage (1957) - Marie Morel (uncredited)
 Adorables démons (1957) - The concierge
 Mademoiselle and Her Gang (1957) - Gravos
 Les Espions (1957) - La buraliste
 Le désir mène les hommes (1957) - Félicie
 Sylviane de mes nuits (1957) - La cabaretière
 First of May (1958) - Mme Tartet
 Le Miroir à deux faces (1958) - Marguerite Benoît
 Dangerous Games (1958) - La femme devenue folle à la mort de son fils
 Quai des illusions (1959) - La patronne de La Sirène
 Drôles de phénomènes (1959) - Mariette
 Nuits de Pigalle (1959) - La Maharanée
 La nuit des traqués (1959) - Maria - La patronne du café
 Le pain des Jules (1960) - Zoé
 Fanny (1961) - Honorine (Fanny's Mother)
 The Last Judgment (1961) - Miser's Wife (uncredited)
 Jessica (1962) - Mamma Parigi
 Bon Voyage! (1962) - Madame Clebert
 Love Is a Ball (1963) - Mme. Gallou
 Le Chant du monde (1965) - La voisine de Clara
 Moment to Moment (1966) - Louise
 Moonshiner's Woman (1968) - Sharon
 Jupiter (1971)
 Le seuil du vide (1972) - La mère de Wanda
 Les gants blancs du diable (1973)
 Zig Zag (1975) - La cantatrice
 L'évasion de Hassan Terro (1976)
 À l'ombre d'un été (1976) - La femme de ménage
 Cheech & Chong's The Corsican Brothers (1984) - Knitting lady #1

References

Bibliography
 Glancy, Mark. Cary Grant, the Making of a Hollywood Legend. Oxford University Press, 2020.

External links

1909 births
1993 deaths
French film actresses
French television actresses
People from Bagneux, Hauts-de-Seine
20th-century French women